The HAL/NAL Regional Transport Aircraft (RTA) or Indian Regional Jet (IRJ) is a regional airliner being designed by India's National Aerospace Laboratories (NAL) and to be manufactured by Hindustan Aeronautics Limited (HAL). The aircraft is planned to be a turboprop or a jet with a capacity of 80–100 passengers. Its basic version will have 80–90 seats (RTA-70) and the cost of the airliner will be 20 percent lower compared to its global competitors.

The 90 seater variant of the aircraft is being designed as of 2021 and is expected to enter service in 2026.

Development
In 2007 Hindustan Aeronautics Limited (HAL) and the National Aerospace Laboratories (NAL)  jointly designed and developed a 70-seater civil regional aircraft. NAL had held discussions with Pratt and Whitney (Canada) and General Electric (U.S.) for an engine. The NAL-designed RTA-70 is meant to ply short-haul routes and compete with planes of French-Italian aircraft maker Avions de Transport Régional (ATR), a leading exporter of turbo-prop aircraft to the Indian sub-continent.

In 2010 at the Indian Aviation exhibition held in Hyderabad, a proposed cabin was on display and more details on the specifications of the aircraft had been revealed.

On 23 December 2010, it was announced that the Indian government had asked NAL to consider the use of turbofan engines on the RTA-70. According to an NAL official, the use of a jet engine was seen as "a stepping stone to the high end" by the government.

In September 2019, it was reported that NAL was holding meetings with  Minister of Science and Technology for the plan of 70-seater civil aircraft. Regional transport aircraft has always been in the long-term vision. After getting in-principle approval from Ministry of Science and Technology, Ministry of Civil Aviation, Ministry of Finance and the Prime Minister's Office, preliminary design phase will be completed in one-and-a-half year and will be submitted to government for approval. Further development was to start after government sanctions the project. In February 2021, it was announced that NAL had finally got permission to design and develop a 90 seater airliner and expecting operations of aircraft from 2026 onwards.

Design
The aircraft is claimed to offer 25% lower acquisition costs, 25% lower operating costs and 50% lower maintenance costs than existing turboprop regional aircraft.

The 70-seat aircraft will have a range of 1,350 nm (2,500 km), and require a take-off field length and landing field length of 900m (2,950 ft). The aircraft would have a length of 28.6m and a wing-span of 29.4m. The aircraft would have a service ceiling of 30,000 ft, a cruising speed of 300kt, and the noise level would meet Stage 4 criteria.

The cabin, which would be able to seat four abreast, would have a width of 3.01m and height of 3.35m. The cargo hold would have a volume of 25m³ (880 ft³).

NAL is considering a composite airframe. The aircraft will be powered by two "next-generation turboprop engine". It would have an indigenous fly-by-wire control system, open distributed modular avionics, automatic dependence surveillance - broadcast navigation capabilities, and advanced displays.

See also

References

External links
 Article Title

HAL aircraft
Proposed aircraft of India
NAL aircraft